The  Río Palmones is a river of the Province of Cádiz in Southeastern coastal Spain. Its source is in Lomas del Castaño, Sierra Blanquilla, and it flows for some  into the Bay of Gibraltar, North of the city of Algeciras, in the neighborhood of Palmones. The Battle of Río Palmones took place here in 1342.

References

Rivers of Spain
Rivers of Andalusia
Algeciras
Geography of the Province of Cádiz